The American Board of Pathology (ABPath) is one of 24 member boards of the American Board of Medical Specialties. This organization was assembled in May 1936, under the approval of the Advisory Board for Medical Specialties (ABMS) and the American Medical Association (AMA) Council on Medical Education and Hospitals. It is the duty of the ABPath to grant certification in Anatomic Pathology, Clinical Pathology and/or Anatomic/Neuropathology to qualified Doctors of Medicine and Doctors of Osteopathic Medicine (M.D./D.O.).

ABPath Mission Statement

The mission of the American Board of Pathology, a member of the American Board of Medical Specialties, is to serve the public and advance the profession of pathology by setting certification standards and promoting lifelong competency of pathologists.

Primary and Subspecialty certificates 
The ABPath issues Primary certificates in:

 Anatomic and Clinical Pathology. 

 Anatomic Pathology

 Clinical Pathology

 Anatomic Pathology/Neuropathology. 

The ABPath issues Subspecialty certificates in:
 Blood Banking/Transfusion Medicine
Chemical Pathology
 Clinical Informatics
 Cytopathology
 Dermatology
 Forensic Pathology
 Hematopathology
 Medical Microbiology
 Molecular Genetic Pathology
 Neuropathology
 Pediatric Pathology

Board certification 
For physicians to receive ABPath certification, they must:
 have obtained a medical degree from an accredited medical school within the US or Canada. Exceptions are made for medical schools outside of the US or Canada at the discretion of the board.
 have full and unrestricted medical licensure in a state or jurisdiction within the US or Canada.
 completed a residency/training program in pathology or pathology subspecialty that is accredited by the Accreditation Council for Graduate Medical Education (ACGME) or the Royal College of Physicians and Surgeons of Canada (RCPSC). 
 passed required examinations; computer based examinations with combined written and practical sections and for some exams Virtual Microscopy.

Examinations
The American Board of Pathology administers two "primary examinations": one examination in anatomic pathology and one in clinical pathology, where candidates pursuing combined certification are required to take both. Both examinations are in multiple-choice format with one best answer for each question.

Continuing Certification 
A physician who is board certified is recognized as a diplomate; one who has medical specialty expertise. To maintain this precedence, the physician must participate in the ABPath's program for Continuing Certification (CC). This program has a four-part framework that emphasizes 1) Professionalism and Professional Standing, 2) Lifelong Learning and Self-Assessment, 3) Assessment of Knowledge, Judgment, and Skills, and 4) Improvement in Medical Practice. This framework is used to evaluate:
 Practice-based Learning and Improvement
 Patient Care and Procedural Skills
 Systems-based Practice
 Medical Knowledge
 Interpersonal and Communication Skills
 Professionalism
All member boards under the ABMS have this four-part framework and these six core competencies as bases for their MOC programs.

See also 
 American Society for Investigative Pathology
 American Society of Cytopathology
 College of American Pathologists
 United States and Canadian Academy of Pathology

References 

Medical associations based in the United States